The Four-man competition at the IBSF World Championships 2020 was held on 29 February and 1 March 2020.

Results
The first two runs were started on 29 February at 13:34. The last two runs were held on 1 March at 13:04.

References

Four-man